Burnt Oak is a London Underground station in Burnt Oak, north London, on Watling Avenue, off the A5 (the Edgware Road, originally a Roman Road known as Watling Street). The station is on the Edgware branch of the Northern line, between Edgware and Colindale stations, and in Travelcard Zone 4.

Location
Burnt Oak is on Watling Avenue, situated near the Burnt Oak Library, separated by the rail tracks. The station serves a moderate residential area. Rows of shops are along Watling Avenue. Barnfield Primary School, Burnt Oak Brook, Goldbeaters Primary School, Barnet Burnt Oak Leisure Center and Edgware Community Hospital are nearby.

History
The station was designed by architect Stanley Heaps and opened as Burnt Oak (for Watling)  on 27 October 1924, two months after the extension of the Hampstead & Highgate Line from Hendon Central to Edgware had opened. For a while, the station was going to be named "Sheves Hill", and this name appears on a version of the Underground map from 1924. On a later version "Sheves Hill" is crossed out with "Burnt Oak" printed on the side. The station was originally provided with a temporary structure before the final ticket office building was constructed in 1925. The suffix was dropped from the name about 1950.

In 2018, it was announced that the station would gain step free access by 2022, as part of a £200m investment to increase the number of accessible stations on the Tube.

Services and connections
The station is on the London Underground Northern line, between Edgware and Colindale stations, in Zone 4. The typical off-peak service, in trains per hour (tph) is:
10 tph northbound to Edgware
10 tph southbound to Morden via Bank or Kennington via Charing Cross

London Buses routes 32, 114, 142, 204, 251, 292, 302, 614 and 644, and night routes N5 and N16 serve the station.

Gallery

References

External links

 London Transport Museum Photographic Archive
 
 
 
 

Northern line stations
Tube stations in the London Borough of Barnet
Former London Electric Railway stations
Railway stations in Great Britain opened in 1924
London Underground Night Tube stations
Stanley Heaps railway stations